Cotoneaster lacteus, the late cotoneaster or milkflower cotoneaster, is a species of flowering plant in the genus Cotoneaster of the family Rosaceae, native to the Yunnan Province of China. Clusters of white flowers are followed by masses of small, globose, red fruits (pomes) in autumn. Unusually for this genus, the fruits are avoided by birds, hence garden escapes are rare, and the fruit persists on the plant throughout the winter.

The Latin specific epithet lacteus refers to the milk-white flowers.

Cotoneaster lacteus may be grown as a hedge. It has gained the Royal Horticultural Society's Award of Garden Merit.

References

lacteus